The Bergen Program for Transport, Urban Development and the Environment is a political agreement for financing road and light rail investments in Bergen, Norway, from 2002 to 2015. The projects cost , and will be partially financed through state grants and partially through a toll ring.

The main projects are:
 Construction of the Bergen Light Rail from the city center via Nesttun and Rådal to Bergen Airport, Flesland.
 The Skansen Tunnel in the city center
 Ring Road West
 Various pedestrian and cyclist roads

References

External links
Official site

Transport in Bergen
Bergen Light Rail